Michael Smuin (October 13, 1938 – April 23, 2007) was an American ballet dancer, choreographer and theatre director. He was co-founder and director of his own dance company, the Smuin Ballet in San Francisco.

Biography
Born in Missoula, Montana, Smuin was a principal dancer with the American Ballet Theatre and the San Francisco Ballet, for which he served as co-artistic director from 1973 through 1985. In 1994 he founded Smuin Ballet.  He also choreographed for the Dance Theatre of Harlem, Washington Ballet, Pacific Northwest Ballet, and Milwaukee Ballet.

Smuin's Broadway credits included Little Me (1962) as a dancer, Anything Goes (1987) as a choreographer, and Sophisticated Ladies (1981) and Shogun: The Musical (1990) as choreographer and director. He also choreographed the 1995 West End production of Mack and Mabel.

Smuin's film credits included The Fantasticks, A Walk in the Clouds, The Joy Luck Club, The Cotton Club, and Rumble Fish.

Smuin collapsed and died of a heart attack while teaching company class in San Francisco.

Awards and nominations
Awards
1984 Emmy Award for Outstanding Achievement in Choreography – Great Performances: Dance in America
1988 Tony Award for Best Choreography – Anything Goes
1988 Drama Desk Award for Outstanding Choreography – Anything Goes
Nominations
1981 Tony Award for Best Choreography – Sophisticated Ladies
1981 Tony Award for Best Direction of a Musical – Sophisticated Ladies
1981 Emmy Award for Outstanding Achievement in Choreography – Great Performances: Dance in America

References

External links
Smuin Ballet official website
 
 
KQED artist profile

1938 births
2007 deaths
American theatre directors
American male ballet dancers
American choreographers
Emmy Award winners
Artists from Missoula, Montana
Tony Award winners
20th-century American ballet dancers